Joseph Evouna (born 23 October 1952) is a Cameroonian former cyclist. He competed at the 1972 Summer Olympics and 1980 Summer Olympics.

References

External links
 

1952 births
Living people
Cameroonian male cyclists
Olympic cyclists of Cameroon
Cyclists at the 1972 Summer Olympics
Cyclists at the 1980 Summer Olympics
Place of birth missing (living people)